Idropranolol is a beta blocker that was never marketed.

References

Beta blockers
Abandoned drugs
N-isopropyl-phenoxypropanolamines